Whey is a dairy manufacturing byproduct.

Whey may also refer to:
 Whey (unit), a unit of weight for butter and cheese
 WHEY, a radio station in Michigan, United States

See also
 Curds and whey (disambiguation)
 Way (disambiguation)
 Wei (disambiguation)
 Wey (disambiguation)